Māris Verpakovskis (born 15 October 1979), is a Latvian retired professional footballer who played as a striker. He represented the Latvia national team at UEFA Euro 2004 and is the only Latvian player to score at the end stage of a major international football tournament.

Club career

Latvia
Born in Liepāja, Latvia, Verpakovskis started his career in hometown club FK Liepājas Metalurgs, for which he played from 1995 till 2001 and scored ten goals in 59 appearances. In 2001 Verpakovskis joined another Latvian side, Skonto Riga, where he scored 41 goals in 77 appearances. This period of time is known for being the peak of Verpakovskis's career. His performances were being recognized by many top European clubs, and in the late 2003 he signed a contract with the Ukrainian top team Dynamo Kyiv.

Dynamo Kyiv
Soon after joining, Verpakovskis quickly earned his spot in starting 11, scoring five goals in 11 appearances. He scored his first UEFA Champions League goal against the Turkish club Trabzonspor, which helped Dynamo Kyiv qualify for the next round and later Verpakovskis also scored a goal against Real Madrid in the group stage, helping to earn a 2–2 draw in Kyiv. Verpakovskis scored a total of three goals in the Champions League. After being honored as the Dynamo Kyiv's best player of 2004 by team fans his career slowly started to decline, majorly due to a conflict with Dynamo's former coach Yozhef Sabo. From that time Verpakovkis had been loaned out for several seasons in a row, as his contract with Dynamo was still active.

Loans
In 2007 Verpakovskis made a promising move to Spain, after he was signed on a loan deal by Getafe. Amid high competition for a place in the starting line-up, Verpakovskis scored one goal in 13 appearances. Right after returning from Spain, Verpakovskis was loaned to HNK Hajduk Split from Croatia, along with his Dynamo team-mates Florin Cernat and Goran Sablić. Verpakovskis had a good season in Hajduk, scoring five goals in 18 appearances and played the key role in team's victories. In early 2008 he suffered an injury and did not play for the remaining time of his loan at Hajduk Split. He made a short comeback to Kyiv during the summer of 2008. Verpakovskis was on a loan term with Spanish side Celta de Vigo for the 2008–09 season, playing eight league matches and scoring no goals. In 2009, Verpakovskis had to extend his contract with Dynamo Kyiv for two years and the Greek Super League club Ergotelis signed him on a two-year loan. During those two years Verpakovskis played 46 league games and scored seven goals for the club. After the season, in 2011, his loan spell ended and he returned to Kyiv.

FK Baku
In 2011 Verpakovskis signed a contract with Azerbaijan Premier League club FC Baku for one season with an option to extend it for another one alongside his international team-mate Deniss Ivanovs. In his first season there Verpakovskis scored three goals in 19 league matches and it was decided by the club's board that the contract would be extended for another season. Verpakovskis renewed his contract in June 2012. The next season was not successful for the Latvian international as he saw himself lose the place in the starting eleven, making only eight league appearances and scoring no goals. Despite scoring two goals and helping Baku grab a 3–1 victory over Sumgayit FK in the 1/8 finals of the Azerbaijan Cup on 28 November 2012, Verpakovskis left the club in January 2013.

Ergotelis
On 30 January 2013, rumours in the Greek and Latvian media appeared that Verpakovskis could rejoin the Greek Football League club Ergotelis. This information was officially confirmed by the club and the player one day later - on 31 January 2013. Verpakovskis made his return debut for the club on 20 February 2013 in a league match against Doxa Drama. On 29 April 2013, Verpakovskis scored both goals in his club's 2–0 league victory over Olympiacos Volou. Verpakovskis then scored in the last match of the season on 26 May 2013 to secure a 1–1 draw against Niki Volos. This goal and point secured Ergotelis a return to the Super League Greece. Verpakovskis made his Super League return debut on 26 August 2013 in a 2–0 victory over Levadiakos. He scored his first goal since return to the Superliga on 2 November 2013 in a 2–1 loss to P.A.O.K. On 10 November 2013, Verpakovskis scored for the second consecutive Superliga match in a row, helping Ergotelis secure a 3–1 victory over Panthrakikos. In mid-season, January 2014, Verpakovskis informed Ergotelis that he was planning to retire in order to return to Latvia and jointly participate in establishment of a new football club in his local city Liepāja after the city's former club Liepājas Metalurgs had been dissolved. On 27 January 2014, he played his last match for Ergotelis as the club lost 1–0 to Panetolikos with Verpakovskis coming on as a late match substitute. After the game Verpakovskis was honoured by his teammates and the club's staff with the president Giannis Daskalakis handing him a special "Verpakovskis" jersey of Ergotelis and stating that "Ergotelis will be Verpakovskis' team for life and Heraklion is the place where Māris can always find his second family." Over one and a half season in Greece Verpakovskis had participated in 28 league matches and scored five goals. In a later interview Verpakovskis revealed that he had wished to finish the season in Greece but due to the limited time for establishment of a club he was forced to return to Latvia as soon as possible.

FK Liepāja
On 23 January 2014, the establishment of the newly founded Latvian Higher League club FK Liepāja was officially announced, and following his return from Greece Verpakovkis took office as the club's president. Besides the administrative work he still retains an active player's status. During the 2014 season Verpakovskis appeared in nine league matches and scored one goal. He left the club in November 2018.

Riga FC
A few days after leaving FK Liepāja, Verpakovskis was hired as director of football at Riga FC. It was confirmed on 25 November 2018.

On 31 May 2019, Verpakovskis played a game for FC Caramba Riga, playing 45 minutes and scoring a goal in a 4–0 victory, helping the team to reach the second leg of the Latvian Cup.

International career
Verpakovskis made his debut for the Latvia national team on 9 September 1999 in a 2–1 victory over Greece, scoring in that match. He rose to international prominence as the highest goalscorer for Latvia in their successful UEFA Euro 2004 qualification campaign, with six goals in ten matches. He scored once for Latvia in Euro 2004 and nearly scored what could have been a candidate for goal of the tournament against Germany, dribbling on a weaving run from the halfway line and beating four German players.

Verpakovskis was Latvia's top scorer in FIFA World Cup 2006 qualification, UEFA Euro 2008 qualification, as well as the FIFA World Cup 2010 qualification. In September 2013, Verpakovskis won his 100th cap for the Latvia national team in a 1–0 World Cup qualifying defeat to Greece. On 29 May 2014, Verpakovskis played his last international match as Latvia beat Estonia in the semi-finals of the 2014 Baltic Cup. He was symbolically substituted by Edgars Gauračs just 13 minutes into the game and honoured by his teammates, national team's staff and supporters. After his retirement the national team's manager Marians Pahars referred to Verpakovskis as "a national team legend". All in all, internationally Verpakovskis has been capped 104 times for Latvia, scoring 29 goals. He is Latvia's all-time best scorer.

Verpakovskis is regarded as the most popular Latvian footballer having surpassed Marians Pahars as his country's most recognisable player. He is the leading all-time top goal scorer for Latvia, with 29 goals.

Personal life
Verpakovskis is the son of Ilmārs Verpakovskis, a Latvian footballer active from 1979 until 1996. Verpakovskis was managed by his father who was player-manager for FK Liepājas Metalurgs in 1994. The Verpakovskis are the only father-son pair to both play for the Latvia national team.

Career statistics

Club

International goals
Scores and results list Latvia's goal tally first, score column indicates score after each Verpakovskis goal.

Honours
Skonto FC
 Latvian Higher League: 2001, 2002
 Latvian Cup: 2001, 2002

Dynamo Kyiv
 Ukrainian Premier League: 2004
 Ukrainian Cup: 2005, 2006

FC Baku
 Azerbaijan Cup: 2012

FK Liepāja
 Latvian Higher League: 2015

Latvia
 Baltic Cup winner: 2001, 2003, 2008, 2014

Individual
 Latvian Man Of The Year: 2003–04
 Top scorer in the history of the national team with 29 goals
 Latvian Footballer of the Year: 2003, 2004
 Dynamo Kyiv player of the year: 2004

See also
 List of men's footballers with 100 or more international caps

References

External links
 Euro 2008 squad details
 Verpakovskis in Primero
 Māris Verpakovskis profile at Nogometni Magazin 
 
 

1979 births
Living people
Sportspeople from Liepāja
Latvian footballers
Association football forwards
Latvia international footballers
Latvian Higher League players
Ukrainian Premier League players
La Liga players
Croatian Football League players
Super League Greece players
Azerbaijan Premier League players
FK Liepājas Metalurgs players
Skonto FC players
FC Dynamo Kyiv players
Getafe CF footballers
RC Celta de Vigo players
HNK Hajduk Split players
Ergotelis F.C. players
FC Baku players
FK Liepāja players
UEFA Euro 2004 players
FIFA Century Club
Latvian expatriate footballers
Expatriate footballers in Ukraine
Expatriate footballers in Spain
Expatriate footballers in Croatia
Expatriate footballers in Greece
Expatriate footballers in Azerbaijan
Latvian expatriate sportspeople in Ukraine
Latvian expatriate sportspeople in Spain
Latvian expatriate sportspeople in Croatia
Latvian expatriate sportspeople in Greece
Latvian expatriate sportspeople in Azerbaijan